For the Nintendo Switch family of systems, Nintendo distributes retro games to subscribers of their Nintendo Switch Online service. Subscribers have access to games for the Nintendo Entertainment System (NES), Super Nintendo Entertainment System (SNES) Game Boy, and Game Boy Color (GBC). For an additional cost, players can also access Nintendo 64, Sega Genesis, and Game Boy Advance (GBA) games.

During its first year, the Online service provided a new batch of NES games on a monthly basis. With the addition of SNES titles in September 2019, releases would no longer be regularly scheduled. In October 2021, Nintendo added a subscription tier called "Expansion Pack" which includes access to Nintendo 64 and Sega Genesis games. In February 2023, Game Boy and Game Boy Color games were added to the base subscription tier, and Game Boy Advance games were added to the Expansion Pack. Games are accessible as long as the user has an active subscription, and a user must connect to the internet at least once a week to continue to access games while offline.

For North America, PAL, and South Korea markets, Nintendo publishes the original NTSC-U versions, retaining their North American naming and 60 Hz support. The Japanese Family Computer variant is used in Japan and Hong Kong. Many games that originally supported local multiplayer now additionally support online multiplayer. Some NES and SNES games also have an alternative version labeled "SP" ("Extra" in some regions) which alters the game in some way, typically either unlocking additional modes, starting the player with additional items or levels, or starting the player midway through the game. 

The service features several titles that were not available on Nintendo's Virtual Console. Some games saw their first re-release in any form since their original debut including Pro Wrestling, Vice: Project Doom and Pilotwings 64. The Switch Online marks the first release in North America for games such as Pop'n TwinBee, Smash Tennis and Mario's Super Picross.

Standard subscription

Nintendo Entertainment System 
With the launch of the Nintendo Switch Online service on September 19, 2018, NES games were made available with 20 titles available at launch. Subscribers can access them through a dedicated app. , there are 94 games available, including:

Super Nintendo Entertainment System 
Announced in a Nintendo Direct on September 4, 2019, SNES games were added to the service worldwide with 20 titles on September 5, 2019. They are available in a separate app from NES games. , there are 73 games available, including:

Game Boy / Game Boy Color 
Announced in a Nintendo Direct on February 8, 2023, Game Boy and Game Boy Color games were added to the service worldwide with 10 games the same day. The Game Boy emulator includes multiple display settings that recreate the visual appearance and color palettes of the original Game Boy, Game Boy Pocket, or Game Boy Color. , there are 12 games available, including:

Expansion Pack

Nintendo 64 
Announced in a Nintendo Direct on September 23, 2021, Nintendo 64 games were added to the service worldwide with nine titles on October 25, 2021. Games are based on the NTSC releases using 60 Hz timing; select games also have the option to play the European versions which run at their original PAL 50 Hz speed, including those that support multiple languages. , there are 24 games available, including:

Sega Genesis / Mega Drive 
Announced in a Nintendo Direct on September 23, 2021, Sega Genesis games were added to the service worldwide with 15 titles on October 25, 2021. , there are 37 games available, including:

Game Boy Advance 
Announced in a Nintendo Direct on February 8, 2023, Game Boy Advance games were added to the service worldwide with six titles the same day. , there are 7 games available, including:

See also
 Arcade Archives
 Sega Ages
 Virtual Console
 Video game console emulator

References

External links
 

Game Boy emulators
Game Boy Advance emulators
Nintendo 64 emulators
Nintendo Entertainment System emulators
Switch Online games
Nintendo services
 
 
Online video game services
Sega Genesis emulators
Super Nintendo Entertainment System emulators
Video game platform emulators
Nintendo Switch Online games